MLB '99 is a Major League Baseball video game for the PlayStation released on April 14, 1998, developed by Sony Interactive Studios America and published by Sony Computer Entertainment America. The color commentary for the game is from Dave Campbell and the play-by-play announcer is Vin Scully. Baltimore Orioles hitter Cal Ripken Jr. is featured on the cover.

It was preceded by MLB '98 and succeeded by MLB 2000.

Reception

The game received "favorable" reviews according to the review aggregation website GameRankings. Six months after the game was released, Next Generation said in its review, "For neophytes and casual gamers, such a complex control scheme may seem more like work than fun. Skilled players, however, will rise to the challenge and welcome the flexibility."

References

External links
 
 

1998 video games
Major League Baseball video games
North America-exclusive video games
PlayStation (console) games
PlayStation (console)-only games
Video games developed in the United States